Rineloricaria caracasensis is a species of catfish in the family Loricariidae. It is a freshwater fish native to South America, where it occurs in the Caribbean coastal drainages of Venezuela. The species is known to be a facultative air-breather.

References 

Loricariini
Catfish of South America
Fish described in 1862
Fish of Venezuela